Mario José Echandi Jiménez (17 June 1915 – 30 July 2011) was the 33rd President of Costa Rica, serving from 1958 to 1962.

As diplomat 
Mario Echandi was a career diplomat.
Prior to his election, he had served as Costa Rica's ambassador to the United States and as the country's representative to both the United Nations and the Organization of American States (1949–1950).
He also served as the minister of foreign affairs (1950-1952) under President Otilio Ulate and in the Legislative Assembly during President José Figueres's second term in office (1953–1958).

His presidency 
President Echandi won the 1958 election by 102.851 votes as candidate of the National Union Party. Francisco J. Orlich was candidate of National Liberation Party with 94.778 and Jorge Rossi had 23.910 votes with the Independent Party. . During his administration some important laws were passed. The "Ley de Aguinaldo" law gave an extra yearly salary to all workers. A law that created the national service for clean water was approved. The law that created a national institute for land reform and colonization. (ITCO law). The first national plan for transit and roads was created, to build a network of highways and roads in the country.

National reconciliation 
During his administration some political figures were allowed to return from exile, like the former president Rafael Ángel Calderón Guardia. His followers were allowed to return to the country and organize politically.

After his presidency 
He ran for the presidency on two further occasions – 1970 and 1982 – but was defeated on both.

Death 
Echandi died on 30 July 2011 at the age of 96 from pneumonia after a heart attack. His wife died in 2001.

References

1915 births
2011 deaths
People from San José, Costa Rica
Presidents of Costa Rica
Members of the Legislative Assembly of Costa Rica
National Union Party (Costa Rica) politicians
Ambassadors of Costa Rica to the United States
Permanent Representatives of Costa Rica to the United Nations
Permanent Representatives of Costa Rica to the Organization of American States
National Unification Party (Costa Rica) politicians
Deaths from pneumonia in Costa Rica
Foreign ministers of Costa Rica